Prosperous Armenia Party (PAP; , abbreviated as ԲՀԿ BHK), is a conservative political party in Armenia. It was founded by businessman Gagik Tsarukyan on 30 April 2004, when the constituent congress of the party took place.

Ideologically, the party is positioned as centre-right on the political spectrum, it advocates economic liberalism, closer ties with Russia, and regarding the European Union it is eurosceptic, while on social issues they are traditionalist. Armenia's second president Robert Kocharyan was instrumental in creation of the party (some claiming Kocharyan himself established it). Kocharyan's influence and role in the party is a subject of debate. In 2012 "most analysts" believed Kocharyan was "closely involved in the party." Some "believe that Kocharyan is the secret leader of the party", while others believe he has no influence over PAP.

Ideology
The party maintains a Pro-Russian ideology and is the only outspokenly Eurosceptic party in Armenia. The party advocates for the preservation of national and traditional values, families, and church and state relations as the most important priorities. The party also claims to support building stronger democratic and neighborly relations within the Caucasus region and with Moldova, Belarus, Ukraine and Central Asia. Despite being a pro-Russian and eurosceptic party, Prosperous Armenia does believe in maintaining strong relations and economic partnership with the European Union.

Power base
According to sociologist Karen Sargsyan, the party base largely consists of provincial rural population. Kotayk Province is widely considered its stronghold. During the 2012 parliamentary election, Prosperous Armenia came first and won around 47.5% of the vote in that province, well above the national average of 30%. While in the 28th electoral district, which includes the city of Abovyan and several surrounding villages, the party won over 71%.

Electoral record
The party debuted in the 2007 Armenian parliamentary elections, winning 25 seats and 15.1% of the votes, making it the second largest political party in parliament.

In the 2012 Armenian parliamentary elections, it more than doubled its share of the vote to 30.12%, winning 35 seats and solidifying its position as the main opposition party.

In the 2017 Armenian parliamentary election, the party participated as part of the Tsarukyan Alliance. The alliance won 31 seats.

Following the 2018 Armenian parliamentary election, Prosperous Armenia lost five seats but was still the second largest party in the National Assembly and one of the two official opposition parties, the other being Bright Armenia.

In May 2021, the party confirmed it would participate in the 2021 Armenian parliamentary elections. Following the election, the party won just 3.95% of the popular vote, losing all political representation in the National Assembly. The party currently acts as an extra-parliamentary force.

Parliamentary elections

Presidential elections

Local elections

Yerevan City Council elections

Activities
In 2014, Prosperous Armenia and the Armenian Liberal Party signed a cooperation agreement.

On 9 November 2020, the party signed a joint declaration with the other member parties of the Homeland Salvation Movement calling on Prime Minister Nikol Pashinyan to resign during the 2020–2021 Armenian protests.

See also

Politics of Armenia
Programs of political parties in Armenia

References

2004 establishments in Armenia
Alliance of Conservatives and Reformists in Europe member parties
Conservative parties in Armenia
Political parties established in 2004
Political parties in Armenia
Social conservative parties
Eurosceptic parties in Armenia